Water Avenue Coffee is a coffee "micro-roaster" with multiple locations in Portland, Oregon. Matt Milletto is a co-owner.

History 
Water Avenue Coffee was established in 2009. The business launched a mobile coffee truck in 2013. Water Avenue signed a lease on a new roasting facility at Southeast 8th and Main in 2015, joining the flagship cafe Water Avenue and Southeast Taylor. The business also began selling barrel-aged coffee in 2015. Chef Ryan Kennedy launched an expanded food menu at the Water Avenue cafe in 2016.

In 2016, Water Avenue Coffee opened a second coffee bar at Sixth at Yamhill in downtown Portland.

Reception 
Brittany Fowler selected Water Avenue Coffee to represent Portland in Business Insider 2015 list of "The best coffee shops in 13 major cities around the US". Willamette Week included the downtown location in a 2016 list of "Our Favorite 11 New Cafes and Roasters in Portland". Samantha Bakall included the business in The Oregonian 2017 list of "Downtown Portland's 10 best coffee shops".

References

External links 

 
 

2009 establishments in Oregon
Coffee companies of the United States
Coffee in Portland, Oregon
Restaurants established in 2009
Restaurants in Portland, Oregon
Buckman, Portland, Oregon